Afranius Hannibalianus (fl. 3rd century) was the consul of 292 AD, a praetorian prefect, a senator and a military officer and commander.

Biography
Believed to belong to a family who originated from the eastern provinces of the Roman empire, Hannibalianus was a military commander who served under the emperor Probus (r. 276–282). A member of the Equestrian order (as noted by the official reference to him as a vir eminentissimus, which was reserved for the equestrian order), he probably was only adlected to the senatorial order after the death of Probus in AD 282.

He was elevated to the rank of Praetorian prefect of the west in AD 286 under Maximian, and had led the imperial armies to victory over the Germanic tribes along the Rhine in that year. Hannibalianus held this rank until probably AD 292, when he was appointed consul prior alongside Julius Asclepiodotus. Then from AD 297–298, he served as the Praefectus urbi of Rome.

Hannibalianus was possibly married to Eutropia, who divorced him to marry the emperor Maximian in around AD 280, but this has been contested. If so, they had one daughter, Flavia Maximiana Theodora, who married the future emperor Constantius Chlorus. It has been speculated that Hannibalianus’ acceptance of his wife's new marriage as well as his position as step-father to the Caesar Constantius accounted for his rapid rise through the administrative offices of the empire.

See also
 Afrania gens

References

Sources
 Chastagnol, André, Les Fastes de la Prefecture de Rome au Bas-Empire (1962) 
 Martindale, J. R.; Jones, A. H. M, The Prosopography of the Later Roman Empire, Vol. I AD 260–395, Cambridge University Press (1971)

3rd-century Romans
Hannibalianus
Imperial Roman consuls
Late Roman Empire political office-holders
Praetorian prefects
Urban prefects of Rome
Generals of Maximian
Generals of Probus
Year of birth unknown
Year of death unknown